Abby Kathryn Steiner (born November 24, 1999) is an American track and field sprinter. She is the U.S. indoor record holder in the 200 m and 300 m, and the NCAA record holder in the 200 m. Steiner holds personal bests of 10.90 seconds over 100 m and 21.77 seconds over 200 m.

Early life and development
Steiner grew up in the Columbus suburb of Dublin, Ohio, concentrating mainly on soccer, only starting to run track in the eighth grade. She starred in both sports at Dublin Coffman High School. Though sidelined for most of a year by a torn ACL, she was an all-state soccer player while setting four state high school records and winning 16 state individual championships in track. Steiner was a dual-sport scholarship athlete at the University of Kentucky (UK), starting her college career in 2018 as both a soccer player and track athlete.

After a freshman soccer season in 2018 in which she started all 19 games for UK, scoring two goals and recording five assists, Steiner left soccer to concentrate on track full-time. In a 2022 interview for the Lexington Herald-Leader, the daily newspaper of UK's home city of Lexington, Steiner cited this decision as a key to her track development:

Statistics

Information from World Athletics profile unless otherwise noted.

Personal records

National championships

NCAA results from Track & Field Results Reporting System.

International championships

Other honors
In 2022, Steiner was named the recipient of the track and field version of the Honda Sports Award, presented annually to the most outstanding college athlete in each of 12 NCAA Division I women's sports. She also received the 2022 Southeastern Conference scholar-athlete of the year awards for both indoor and outdoor women's track. Steiner graduated from UK with a bachelor's degree in kinesiology and exercise science (an academic program housed in the UK College of Education) in May 2022. She has been accepted to UK's physical therapy program, but is deferring her enrollment to concentrate on her professional track career.

On December 15, 2022, Steiner was awarded the Bowerman Award, the annual award for the top female collegiate track and field athlete.

References

External links

Kentucky Wildcats bio
 

1999 births
Living people
American female sprinters
American women's soccer players
Kentucky Wildcats women's track and field athletes
Kentucky Wildcats women's soccer players
Women's association football forwards
Track and field athletes from Ohio
University of Kentucky College of Education alumni
World Athletics Championships medalists
World Athletics Championships winners
21st-century American women